Stranger in Paradise is a 2008 crime novel by Robert B. Parker, the seventh in his Jesse Stone series.

Plot summary
In Stranger in Paradise, Wilson "Crow" Cromartie from Trouble in Paradise returns to the quiet town. On arrival he meets with Jesse Stone to let him know he’s in town looking for someone. Unfortunately Jesse cannot arrest him because the statute of limitations has run out for the Stiles Island robbery Crow was involved in ten years earlier that cost residents over $20 million in cash. And since Jesse has no evidence linking him to any of the murders, he has no choice but to let Crow go about his business.

It turns out Crow is looking for a 14-year-old girl named Amber Francisco. Amber is the daughter of Florida mob boss Louis Francisco, who employs Crow to find his daughter. Crow starts by searching her credit card record. He discovers that a flat screen television was purchased on the card. At the store where it was purchased, Crow poses as Amber’s father complaining that the television was never delivered. The clerk assures him that it was and gives him the address that it was delivered to. There he encounters the Horn Street gang, a group of young Latino gangbangers. He asks for the whereabouts of the girl, but when a gangbanger named Puerco tries to get tough, Crow shoots and kills him. The gang leader, Esteban, then gives up her location.

At their home, Crow confronts Amber, and her mother Fiona. Fiona is a drunk, and when Amber gets disrespectful with Crow he slaps her across the face. Crow then calls Francisco in Florida to let him know that he has located the girl. Francisco orders Crow to murder Fiona and bring his daughter back to Florida. Crow, for some mysterious reason, refuses. Instead he calls Chief Stone and relates the story to him, even admitting the murder of Puerco, claiming self-defense. Later when Amber’s boyfriend, the gangbanger Esteban, discovers who she is he contacts Francisco in Florida and accepts the contract on Fiona. Amber assists in the murder of her mother, luring her out back of their apartment. However, when she later discovers that Esteban also agreed to bring her back to her father in Florida, she runs away. Desperate to stay away from her creepy father, she calls Crow.

Crow takes the girl to Chief Stone. Jesse puts her up in his condo, and has Jenn come over to help with her. Molly and Suit watch her during the day while Jenn and Jesse are working. Meanwhile, Francisco sends four mobsters up to Paradise to kill Crow. Crow discovers them immediately and starts picking them off one at a time. The police find a hotel key on the second victim, which leads them to one of the mobsters. When the police threaten to frame him for firing on the police when he was arrested, which would give him his third felony and a life sentence, he agrees to inform on his employer. From him they discover that Francisco has given the contract on Crow’s life to the Horn Street gang. They also discover that Francisco is on his way up to personally see that Crow is killed and to retrieve his daughter. Jesse and Crow then formulate a plan to catch the killers in the act.

Amber calls Crow and asks her to meet him on the middle of a bridge. Jesse and Crow immediately know this is the setup. With the police standing by, Crow goes to the bridge. They have a Hollywood dummy with him dressed to look like Amber. The Horn Street gangbangers drive by and open fire on Crow who dives over the sea wall and disappears. Francisco and his men then open fire on the Horn Street gang. Immediately the police surround them, but before they are arrested one of the Florida mobsters named Romero walks up to Esteban and shoots him dead. Francisco then discovers that the dummy is not his daughter, and is hauled off to jail. After his release, he turns up dead in Florida along with two of his body guards. Although the police suspect Crow, he is nowhere to be found.

Jesse suspects correctly that Crow is just in it for the excitement. Still rich from his Stiles Island caper ten years earlier, he involves himself in this situation simply to alleviate his boredom, and for sex. During his stay he beds Marcy Campbell, the hostage he protected ten years earlier, and Jesse’s right-hand woman Molly Crane while her husband and kids are away. Crow sees himself as an Apache warrior playing cowboys and Indians. And although Jesse feels some confliction about working with Crow, as he discusses with Dix, he wants to help Amber. He ends up getting some money for her from her father before he is murdered and then puts her up with Daisy Dyke and her wife. She seems unconcerned with her parents murders, and the novel ends with her having dinner with Jesse and Jenn.

Subplots
A subplot involves a rich Paradise woman named Miriam Fiedler trying to close down a preschool for minority children on a piece of land called the Crown Estate. Jesse’s initial belief is that she is just a racist that does not want Latino children in her neighborhood. She raises concerns about that element drawing gang activity to the community and lowering property values. Later Molly discovers that Suit is having an affair with Miriam. Suit then tells Jesse that Miriam has been asking questions about him trying to find out if he might accept a bribe to help close the school. Jesse begins investigating her and discovers that she is the heir to the Crown Estate which is estimated at $10 million. He also discovers that Miriam was once worth upwards of $50 million and now is worth less than $300,000. When he questions her about this she confesses that she married ten years ago, only to discover her new husband was a homosexual that only married her for her money. Her husband then threatens to humiliate her publicly if she divorces him. Fearing this, she stays married to him and watches him squander her fortune over the next decade, mostly on his boyfriend. Jesse steps in and intimidates the husband into giving her a quiet divorce.

References

Jesse Stone (novel series)
2008 American novels
Novels by Robert B. Parker
American crime novels